Karakoyunlu is a town and district of Iğdır Province in the Eastern Anatolia region of Turkey. Part of the district forms the international border between Turkey and Armenia.

Statues with ram heads
Gravestones with ram heads existing in almost all old cemeteries in Iğdır Plain are remnants from the Kara Koyunlu period. These commemorate brave, heroic persons and young persons who died at a young age.

Population
Shia Azerbaijanis make up the majority in the town, while Sunni Kurds populate much of the rural portion of the district. Of the twenty villages in the district, eight are populated by Azerbaijanis.

References

External links 

  Official website of the Karakoyunlu Municipality - this website is partially accessible.
  Official website of the Karakoyunlu Karakoyunlu District 
  Iğdır's News website 

Populated places in Iğdır Province
States in medieval Anatolia
Districts of Iğdır Province
Towns in Turkey
Kurdish settlements in Turkey